Bagremovo (Hungarian: Brazília or Bárdossyfalva) is a village in Serbia. It is situated in the Bačka Topola municipality, in the North Bačka District, Vojvodina province. As of 2011, the village had a population of 151.

References

See also
List of places in Serbia
List of cities, towns and villages in Vojvodina

Places in Bačka